Likwala may refer to:

 Kwala language a Bantu language of the Republic of the Congo
 Liq’wala a dialect of the Kwakʼwala language spoken in British Columbia, Canada